Violet Bent Backwards over the Grass is the debut book by American singer-songwriter Lana Del Rey. A poetry collection featuring over 30 original poems and photography, including "13 longer poems" and several short pieces, the collection is Del Rey's first published work and was released by Simon & Schuster on September 29, 2020.

In December 2019, Del Rey announced that she would be releasing a spoken word album to accompany the book, also featuring music by American producer Jack Antonoff, which was set to be released in January 2020. Following a delay due to personal problems, the album was ultimately released on July 28, 2020 through Interscope/Polydor. The cover artwork, a painting of an orange tree by artist Erika Lee Sears, was released in April 2020. The final release dates for the book were announced on July 9, 2020, with the album being released on July 28, 2020, and the hardcover book to follow on September 29, 2020. Half of the proceeds from the book will go to the Navajo Water Project.

Background and development
Since her musical beginnings, Del Rey has expressed how she has been inspired by poetry, with Walt Whitman and Allen Ginsberg being instrumental to her songwriting. Del Rey has written several poems which she has used as spoken monologues in her music videos and short films, the most notable being the lengthier, melancholic pieces featured Ride (2012) and Tropico (2013), in the latter of which she also recited poems from Whitman's Leaves of Grass.

In 2018, Del Rey announced her intention to release a book of poetry. She explained how, following some writer's block while beginning work on Norman Fucking Rockwell! (2019) in 2017, she had begun writing poetry. Shortly afterwards, Del Rey revealed she would be binding the book herself and be selling copies for as little as a dollar. When asked why the book would be so inexpensive, Del Rey replied "because my thoughts are priceless." However, Lana's original plans changed when Simon & Schuster acquired the rights and published the book regularly and at a standard price.

During her promotional cycle of Norman Fucking Rockwell!, Del Rey described the book as consisting of "thirteen long poems", though she has teased shorter pieces on social media since, including "Never to Heaven", "Happy", and "Quiet Waiter-Blue Forever," among other pieces.

Release 
Violet Bent Backwards over the Grass was released on September 29, 2020, as a 128 page hardcover book. On October 3, 2020, Del Rey hosted a surprise reading and signing of the book at a Barnes & Nobles store in Los Angeles. The event was met with controversy due to Del Rey's decision to wear a mesh mask and take pictures in close proximity to her fans during the ongoing COVID-19 pandemic. The event got eventually shut down for not following health regulations. Del Rey responded to the criticism, saying that the mask had a plastic layer sewn into it.

The release saw success, with the book landing at number 4 of the New York Times bestseller list.

Spoken word album

Violet Bent Backwards over the Grass was also released as Del Rey's first spoken word album. It was released through Interscope and Polydor on July 28, 2020, two months before the release of the book. Del Rey selected 14 of the 30 poems that appear in the book to record. In an Instagram livestream Del Rey originally announced the album's release date as January 4, 2020 She expressed her desire to have 50 percent of the profits benefit charities supporting Native American land constancy and protecting indigenous rights in the United States. She added that the album would cost "about a dollar" and that the charities would rotate every couple of years. However the album has never been sold for $1.

Violet Bent Backwards over the Grass was released exclusively in physical formats, CD and vinyl record. The album's only single, "LA Who Am I to Love You", was released on the same day as the album and was made available on all platforms, including a limited time streaming release.

Aside from Del Rey's own voice, the album features instrumental production from frequent collaborator Jack Antonoff, with whom Del Rey first worked on Norman Fucking Rockwell! (2019), and later on Chemtrails over the Country Club (2021)

Commercial performance 
The album peaked at number 19 on Billboard's US Top Album Sales chart and number 3 on the US Vinyl Albums chart.

Track listing

Charts

References

2020 albums
2020 poetry books
2020s spoken word albums
Albums produced by Jack Antonoff
American poetry collections
Charity albums
Interscope Records albums
Lana Del Rey albums
Polydor Records albums
Self-published books
Simon & Schuster books
Spoken word albums by American artists